RC Motorsport was an auto racing team based in Italy.

History

Single-seaters

Former series results

Formula 3 Euro Series

† – Guest driver - ineligible for points.

References

External links

Italian auto racing teams
World Series Formula V8 3.5 teams
Formula Renault Eurocup teams
Formula 3 Euro Series teams
British Formula Three teams
Italian Formula 3 teams
Auto GP teams

German Formula 3 teams
Acceleration teams
Auto racing teams established in 1989
Auto racing teams disestablished in 2010